James Aloisi is a Boston-based writer, commentator and consultant with a specialty in transportation planning and policy, and law.

Aloisi is the founding partner of the Pemberton Square Group, a consulting firm providing clients with advice in areas such as real estate, transportation, and communications. He served as Massachusetts Secretary of Transportation from 2008-09 and was member of the Board of the Massachusetts Port Authority and Massachusetts Turnpike Authority. Aloisi is a former partner at Hill & Barlow and Goulston & Storrs.

Aloisi is a regular contributor to Massachusetts's Commonwealth Magazine, published by the Massachusetts Institute for a New Commonwealth, "an independent think tank uniting non-partisan research, civic journalism and independent polling" typically identified as MassINC. He is the author of three well-regarded books on significant political and social figures and moments in the history of Massachusetts and the United States of America.

Aloisi is also a member on the board of Boston-based transit policy advocacy group TransitMatters.

Books
The Big Dig (2004) was a brief history of Boston's Big Dig, the largest public works project in American history.
Magic in the Air: The Times & Life of Boston's Honey Fitz (2007) recounts the ascendancy of John Francis Fitzgerald, grandfather of John F Kennedy. Fitzgerald's political career played out during a critical crossroads in Boston politics.
The Vidal Lecture: Sex and Politics in Massachusetts and the Persecution of Chief Justice Robert Bonin (2011) documents the turbulence and discord that marked a struggle between reformers and the established political leadership, and a larger struggle between two generations of political leaders.
"Massport at 60" (2018) commemorates the 60th anniversary of the Massachusetts Port Authority and documents its history across local and state politics.

References

Massachusetts Secretaries of Transportation
Politicians from Boston
Living people
Writers from Boston
Year of birth missing (living people)